Pembertonia latisquamea is a species of daisy (Asteraceae), native to Western Australia. It was first described by Ferdinand von Mueller in 1878 as Brachyscome latisquamea and transferred to the genus, Pembertonia in 2004 by Philip Short.

It is a climber or a shrub growing to 1.45 metres high, on white sand, red sand, silty clay and limestone, and flowers from September to October or July.

References

External links
Pembertonia latisquamea occurrence data from Australasian Virtual Herbarium

Asteraceae
Taxa named by Ferdinand von Mueller